Departure, Departures or The Departure may refer to:

Literal meaning
 Departure, also called takeoff, the phase of flight from moving along the ground to flying in the air
 Departures, the section of a transport hub designated for outgoing passengers, freight, and vehicles

Arts, entertainment, and media

Paintings
Departure (Beckmann), a 1932–1935 triptych by German painter Max Beckmann

Films
Departure (1931 film), a French drama film 
Departure (1938 film), a 1938 Italian comedy film
Departure (1986 film), an Australian film 
Departures (2008 film), a Japanese drama film 
Departures (2011 film), a Turkish short film
Departure (2015 film), a British film starring Juliet Stevenson
The Departure (1967 film), a Belgian film
The Departure (2017 film), a 2017 American film
Then Came You (2018 film), a 2018 American film also known as Departures
Unfinished (film), a 2018 Korean film previously known as Departure

Literature
Departures (magazine), an American lifestyle magazine
Departures (short story collection), by Harry Turtledove
The Departure (novel), by K.A. Applegate
"The Departure" (short story), by Franz Kafka

Music
The Departure, an English rock band

Albums
Departure (Jesse McCartney album), 2008
Departure (Journey album), 1980
Departure (Taio Cruz album), 2008
Departure, 1969 album by Pat Boone
Departures (album), 2013 album by Bernard Fanning
Samurai Champloo Music Record: Departure, 2004
Departures, 2021 album by Jon Foreman

Songs
"Departure", a song by The Moody Blues from the 1968 album In Search of the Lost Chord 
"Departure", a song by R.E.M. from the 1996 album New Adventures in Hi-Fi 
"Departure", a song by Trivium from the 2005 album Ascendancy 
"Departure", a 2011 song by Masatoshi Ono
"Departure", a song by Misery Signals from the 2013 album Absent Light
"Departure", a song by Scandal from the 2014 album Hello World
"Departures" (Globe song), 1996
"(It's A) Departure", a song by The Long Winters from the 2006 album Putting the Days to Bed
"The Departure", a song by Falling in Reverse from the 2017 album Coming Home
"Départe" (French for "Departure"), a song by Rosetta from the 2005 album The Galilean Satellites

Television
Departure (TV series), a Canadian-British suspense drama series
Departures (TV series), a Canadian adventure travel documentary series

See also 
 
 
 Departure Lake (disambiguation)
 Departure Lounge (disambiguation)
 Point of Departure (disambiguation)